Biruința (Moldovan Cyrillic: Бируинца) is a town in Sîngerei District, Moldova.

References

Cities and towns in Moldova
Sîngerei District